, alternatively romanized as Jō-ō or Shōō, was a  after Keian and before Meireki. This period spanned the years from September 1652 through April 1655.

Change of era
 1652 : The era name was changed to Jōō (meaning "receiving answers"), which was to mark the death of the third shōgun, Tokugawa Iemitsu. The previous era ended and a new one commenced in Keian 5, on the 18th day of the 9th month.

The name of this new era came from the Book of the Jin:  "The Xia and the Shang dynasties follow their destinies, so the House of Zhou came when it was time." (夏商承運、周氏応期)

Events of the Jōō era
 October 3, 1653 (Jōō 2, 12th day of the 8th month): A violent fire destroyed a large part of the Imperial palace and many temples which were nearby. Shortly thereafter, several girls, aged 12–14 years, were imprisoned for having started this fire and others in Heian-kyō.
 August 18, 1654 (Jōō 3, 6th day of the 7th month): A famous priest, Ingen, arrived at Nagasaki from China. His intention was to reform the practice of Buddhism in Japan.

Sakoku: Before and after 1653
Within the Jōō period, Japan was implementing the Sakoku policy which adopted by Tokugawa Bakumatsu.  Sakoku (鎖国) means closed country in Japanese. Japan was adopting this policy from 1639 to 1868. There was barely any foreign trade from other countries, with exception to Chinese and Dutch merchant. Japanese residences were strictly monitored by the Government. People were not allowed to leave the country, with consequence of death penalty. Foreigners were in the same situation, anyone who attempted to enter Japan's territory would be killed by the soldiers right away. The entire country was dictated by Tokugawa government. The Sakoku policy was adopted by the ruler for preventing invaders, and keeping their national characteristics and national religion. This policy was banned after the Edo Period (1603–1868). The country was re-opened to the world in 1868.

Notes

References
 Nussbaum, Louis Frédéric and Käthe Roth. (2005). Japan Encyclopedia. Cambridge: Harvard University Press. ; OCLC 48943301
 Porter, Robert P. (1918). Japan: The Rise of a Modern Power. Oxford: Clarendon Press. OCLC 3881028
 Screech, Timon. (2006). Secret Memoirs of the Shoguns: Isaac Titsingh and Japan, 1779–1822. London: RoutledgeCurzon. ; OCLC 65177072
 Titsingh, Isaac. (1834). Nihon Ōdai Ichiran; ou,  Annales des empereurs du Japon.  Paris: Royal Asiatic Society, Oriental Translation Fund of Great Britain and Ireland. OCLC 5850691

External links
 National Diet Library, "The Japanese Calendar" -- historical overview plus illustrative images from library's collection
 Sennyuji Temple Museum -- funereal ceremonies for Emperor Go-Kōmyō
 Imperial Household web site -- link to image of Emperor Go-Kōmyō's official Imperial misasagii (in Japanese)

Japanese eras
1650s in Japan